The IBM PS/2 Note and PS/note are a series of notebooks from the  PS/2 line by IBM. It was announced in March 1992, half a year prior to the release of the first ThinkPad, the IBM ThinkPad 700. The series was discontinued in 1994.

Background 
After the departure of Bob Lawten from IBM, the team at IBM had little development direction after the IBM PS/2 L40 SX. James Cannavino pushed for the new notebook series, which fell behind schedule. The N45 SL, N51 SX and N51 SLC were announced on the same day as the IBM PS/2 (color laptop) CL57 SX. During this time there was a distinction between notebooks and laptops, where the former are A4 sized and the latter are larger. 

The notebooks were modeled after the PS/55 Note which was released by IBM in Japan in April 1991.

Models

PS/2 note 
Mainstream line with 7-row layout only.

N33 SX 

The  PS/2 Model N33 SX (also known as  PS/2 note N33 SX) was the first notebook-sized computer from IBM which was announced in 1991. This model was based on the AT-bus and had between 2 or 6MB RAM. It has a 9.5" 16-greyscale VGA LCD (640x480), a 1.44MB floppy, expansion ports and a 40MB or 80MB HDD, and weighs .

N51 SX 
The PS/2 Model N51 SX (or PS/2 Note N51 SX) was a low-end mainstream notebook, which contained a slower version of the typical 386SX found in other notebooks. The N51 SX was delayed for months.

N51 SLC 
The PS/2 Model N51 SLC (or PS/2 Note N51 SLC) was based on IBM their 368SLC. This model has a PS/55 note sibling.

PS/note 
Entry-level line.

N45 SL 
The PS/note N45 SL was priced at $2,045 and contains a 25MHz 386SL. It had 2MB RAM and a 80 or 120MB HDD and was equipped with only 6-row keyboard without dedicated navigation block, the similar layout as a low-end ThinkPad 300 laptop.

PC Mag considered the display a disappointment, but noted its good design and performance.

It was manufactured by Zenith Data Systems.

182/E82/N82 
The PS/note 182 and PS/note E82 was equipped with 80386SL CPU, PS/note N82 was equipped with 80386SX and released in 1992. This line has a 7-row keyboard layout and similar to next-year PS/note 425 model case (but with gray case color and without TrackPoint).

Model 425/425C 
The PS/note 425/425C are identical to the ThinkPad 350/350C.

Accessories 
Communication cartridge
Communication cartridge II 
External floppy disk drive
External numpad

Discontinuation 
In March 1994, it was reported that IBM would consolidate the PS/note series into the ThinkPad 300 series. In 1994, the ThinkPad 360 series was released.

References

External links 

 Thinkwiki.de - N33SX
Thinkwiki.de - N45SL
 Thinkwiki.de - N51
Comparison between PS/Note Model 425 and ThinkPad 350C

PS/2 Note
Computer-related introductions in 1992